The national flag of Sierra Leone is a tricolour consisting of three horizontal green, white and blue bands.  It was adopted in 1961, Sierra Leone's independence year, to replace the British Blue Ensign defaced with the arms of the Crown Colony of Sierra Leone.

History
The British first arrived in what is now modern-day Sierra Leone in 1787, when philanthropists and abolitionists acquired  of land situated close to Bunce Island for freed slaves.  The site of the settlement is where Freetown is now located.  It became a crown colony of the United Kingdom within its colonial empire in 1808, Colony of Sierra Leone.
Under colonial rule, Sierra Leone used the British Blue Ensign and defaced it with the arms of the territory.  The emblem of Sierra Leone at the time consisted of a circle depicting an elephant, an oil palm tree and mountains, along with the letters "S.L." standing for the initials of the territory's name.  Other than the initials, the rest of the emblem's design was identical to the colonial arms of the Gold Coast, The Gambia and the Lagos Colony.  Sierra Leone was granted its own unique coat of arms in 1914, and the emblem on the Blue Ensign was modified to reflect this change.

In 1960, the College of Arms formulated and then approved of a new flag and coat of arms for Sierra Leone, in anticipation of the colony's independence the following year.  The arms was designed first, and its predominant colours of green, white, and blue were subsequently used in the creation of the flag.  It was first hoisted at midnight on 27 April 1961, the day Sierra Leone became an independent country.  Two years later, the government passed a law making it illegal to "insult" the country's flag, along with the flags of "friendly" nations.

Design
The colours of the flag carry cultural, political, and regional meanings.  The green alludes to the country's natural resources – specifically agriculture and its mountains. – while the white epitomizes "unity and justice".  The blue evokes the "natural harbour" of Freetown, the capital city of Sierra Leone, as well as the hope of "contributing to world peace" through its usage.

The flag is very similar to that of the official flag of Galápagos Province, Ecuador. The difference between the flags are very insignificant, with Sierra Leone's one having a lighter blue and green than that of the Galápagos Province.

It is also very similar to the "Erne flag" used by ships on the Shannon–Erne Waterway in Ireland, except that that flag uses deeper shades of green and blue.

The Republic of Molossia, a micronation, uses an upside-down version of the flag.

Legal issues
The Sierra Leonean flag is utilized as a flag of convenience by foreign merchant vessels.  The "minimum enforcement" of admiralty law on such vessels has led to illegal and suspicious activity.  This includes unlawful fishing, as well as the usage of the flag on vessels from countries under United Nations sanctions.

As a result, the Sierra Leonean government has taken measures to curtail registrations related to the practice of flag of convenience.  In 2010, they stopped allowing fishing vessels to register in order to stymie unauthorized catches within both its domestic waters and in international seas.  Two years later, they removed 10 ships from its registry believed to be from Iran.  This followed the seizure of a ship in Lebanon that was carrying weapons for Syria and was purportedly flying the flag of Sierra Leone.

In 2015, following the establishment of their International Ship Registry (SLMARAD) which developed various mechanisms, such as due diligence procedure, FSIs and others, and through the ratification of major IMO and ILO Conventions and implementation of such in their Domestic law, the Sierra Leonean government managed to successfully eliminate such incidents.

Historical flags

Notes

References

External links 

 Queen's and Regimental Colors – Army of Sierra Leone 

Flag
Flags of Africa
Flags introduced in 1961
National flags